Rabindra Mishra is a Nepali philanthropist, ex-journalist, writer, poet, and politician. Currently, Mishra is the Senior Vice-Chairman of Rastriya Prajatantra Party, after having resigned as a general member of Bibeksheel Sajha Party in September 2022.

He earlier resigned as the national president of Bibeksheel Sajha Party in May 2022. He formerly worked as the editor-in-chief of BBC Nepali Service, and left the BBC in February 2017 to enter Nepalese politics. Mishra is also the founder of the global charity, Help Nepal Network, which has chapters in 14 countries and is run entirely by volunteers.

Education
Mishra received his Master's Degree in Major English from Tribhuvan University. He then went to University of the Punjab, Pakistan, earning a Master's Degree in Journalism. He joined University of London and majored in International Politics.

Career
Mishra worked with Nepal Television and Pakistan's leading English-language daily, The News International. He joined the BBC World Service in 1995 as a producer with BBC Nepali Service. Later he worked on English-language flagship programmes, including World Today and Newshour. He was appointed as the chief editor of BBC Nepali Service in 2006.

Political career
On 28 February 2017, Mishra resigned from BBC Nepali to enter politics. He stated that the reason behind his move was to "create a common platform to bring together honest and capable Nepalis from all walks of life for the sake of clean politics to transform Nepal."

The next day, on March 1, Mishra approached the Election Commission with an application to secure the name Sajha Party and a weighing scale as the symbol of his yet-to-be formed political party.

Mishra ran against Nepali Congress leader Prakash Man Singh in the 2017 legislative elections from Kathmandu 1, but was defeated by a margin of 818 votes.

Rabindra Mishra joined the Rastriya Prajatantra Party in September 2022 before the 2022 Nepalese general election. Mishra raced for the second time against Nepali Congress leader Prakash Man Singh in the 2022 election from Kathmandu 1, but got defeated by a narrow margin of 125 votes.

Electoral history

2022 legislative elections

2017 legislative elections

Books 
, Fineprint (2010)
, Nepalaya Publication (2012)
, (2015)

Filmography
 Highway as Doctor

See also
Rastriya Prajatantra Party
Bibeksheel Sajha Party
Sajha Party
Bibeksheel Nepali

References

External links 
 
 

Nepalese male writers
Nepali-language writers
Nepalese journalists
Living people
1967 births
People from Kathmandu
Tribhuvan University alumni
University of the Punjab alumni
Alumni of the University of London
Nepalese political party founders